The Elitserien (literally, the "Elite League") is since the 2007–08 season the highest bandy league in Sweden. It consists of 14 teams. The season ends with one final game in March. The final was held at Studenternas IP in Uppsala from 1991 until 2012. In 2013 and 2014 the final was played at Friends Arena in Solna, and from 2015 to 2017 it was played at the Tele2 Arena. The final returned to 4,600-capacity Studenternas IP indoor stadium in 2018.

Season structure
During the regular season the fourteen teams play each other team at home and away - a total of 26 games per team.

The top six teams directly qualify for the playoffs for the league championship, while the teams ranked from 7th to 10th enter an additional play-off to decide which teams take the other two championship play-off places. The bottom four teams playoff against the top two teams from the Allsvenskan to decide promotion and relegation.

Teams

Current teams (2022–23 season)

* – indoor arena

Teams through the years

The number denotes the place in that year's end stand of the regular league before the championship play-off, while a blank space means the club was not playing in Elitserien that year.
A gold background means the club became Swedish champion that year following the championship play-off, a silver background means the club was the runner-up for the championship.

Notes

Previous winners 

Elitserien is followed by a play-off to decide the national bandy champions. The final for the Swedish championship has been played annually since 1907. Before the start of Elitserien in 2007/2008, the play-off has been preceded by other league structures, most recently by the double structure of Allsvenskan and Elitserien.

Since the start of the present structure of Elitserien, Sandvikens AIK has ended in top of the league 4 times in the end just before the play-off, which is more than any other team. This league win is however not seen as nearly as prestigious as the championship final.

Top goalscorers
Patrik Nilsson has the top scorer record with 94 goals.

See also
 List of Swedish bandy champions

References

External links
 Official website
 Elitserien at Bandyworld.se
 Swedish Bandy Association
 "Professional Bandy News Podcast"

 
Bandy leagues in Sweden
2007 establishments in Sweden
Sports leagues established in 2007
National bandy leagues
Sweden
Professional sports leagues in Sweden